This was the fourth season of Barnes Football Club.

Athletic Sports
 Date: 24 March 1866
 Venue: The Limes, Mortlake. (Field belonging to T. Marsh Nelson, to the back of the White Hart public house).
 Committee: Ebenezer Morley (starter), H. H. Playford (judge), E. Conant, R. G. Graham, R. Wright, G. Villiers
 Secretary: Robert Willis
 Events: 100 yards race, 300 yards race, one mile handicap, 220 yards hurdle race, one mile steeple chase, long jump, high jump with pole.

Notes

Barnes F.C. seasons
Barnes